Qipanshan International Scenery and Tourism Development Zone, often referred to as Qipanshan Tourism Development Zone, is a development zone for scenery and tourism, located in the eastern suburbs of Shenyang, the capital city of Liaoning, China.

Under the jurisdiction of Shenyang's Hunnan District. Qipanshan Tourism Development Zone has an administrative area of 190 square kilometers and consists of three parts: the Forest Park Scenic Area, the Lake Xiu Scenic Area, and the Shenyang Botanical Garden (the former site of International Horticultural Expo 2006). It has three townships under its jurisdiction, and a total population of 51,000.

The main tourist attractions in the area are Mount Qipan, Lake Xiu, Shenyang National Forest Park, Shenyang Botanical Garden, Fuling Mausoleum, Shenyang Forest Safari Park, Shenjing Golf Club, etc.

In 2000, the Development Zone was included in the first batch of China's AAAA-rated scenic areas.

See also
Shenyang's Attractions
Fuling Mausoleum

References

External links

Official site (in Chinese)

Shenyang
AAAA-rated tourist attractions